Samuel Marsh may refer to:
 Samuel Marsh (footballer) (1879–?), English footballer
 Samuel Marsh (railroad executive) (1786–1872), American businessman and president of the Erie Railroad
 Samuel Marsh (politician) (c. 1736–1795), London merchant and politician